John Beckwith may refer to:

Music
 John Christmas Beckwith (1750–1809), English organist and composer
 John Charles Beckwith (organist) (1788–1819), English organist
 John Beckwith (composer) (1927–2022), Canadian composer

Politics
 John Adolphus Beckwith (1800–1880), Canadian politician
 John L. Beckwith (1856–1934), Canadian entrepreneur and politician
 John Beckwith (MP) for Lewes

Sports
 John Beckwith (baseball) (1900–1956), American baseball player, infielder in the Negro leagues
 John Beckwith (footballer) (born 1932), former Australian rules football player and coach

Others
 John Beckwith (major-general), commanded the 20th Regiment of Foot at the Battle of Minden (1759)
 John Charles Beckwith (British Army officer) (1789–1862), British army officer
 John W. Beckwith (1831–1890), American clergyman, Second Bishop of Georgia
 John Beckwith (curator) (1918–1991), museum curator and art historian
 Sir John Beckwith (entrepreneur) (born 1947), British business tycoon
 John Bruce Beckwith (born 1933), American pathologist

Characters
 John Beckwith (character), main character in the movie "Wedding Crashers", played by Owen Wilson

See also
 Jon Beckwith (born 1935), American microbiologist
 Jonathan Beckwith (disambiguation)
 Beckwith (disambiguation)